General elections were held in Botswana on 24 October 2014. The result was an eleventh straight victory for the Botswana Democratic Party, which won 37 of the 57 elected seats. Incumbent President Ian Khama was sworn in for a second term on 28 October.

Electoral system
At the time of the elections the 63 members of the National Assembly were divided between 57 MPs elected in single-member constituencies by first-past-the-post, four members appointed by the governing party, and two ex-officio members (the President and the Attorney General).

Voters had to be Botswana citizens at least 18 years old who had been resident in the country for at least 12 months prior to voter registration. People declared insane, holding dual citizenship, under a death sentence, convicted of an electoral offence or imprisoned for at least six months were not allowed to vote. Candidates had to be Botswana citizens at least 21 years old, without an undischarged bankruptcy, and had to be able to speak and read English sufficiently well to take part in parliamentary proceedings.

Campaign
In November 2013 three opposition parties, the Botswana National Front, the Botswana People's Party and the Botswana Movement for Democracy formed the Umbrella for Democratic Change (UDC) alliance. A total of 192 candidates contested the elections. The Botswana Democratic Party was the only party to contest all 57 seats; the Botswana Congress Party had 54 candidates and the Umbrella for Democratic Change put forward 52, whilst there were also 29 independents.

The UDC accused Khama of being increasingly authoritarian. In response, Khama ran on a platform pledging change.

Results
On 25 October, Botswana's election commission said that the Democratic Party had won 33 of the parliament's seats.  Though vote counting had not been completed, the preliminary results were enough to confirm the Democratic Party had won a majority (at least 29) of the seats, though at a slimmer margin than in the previous election.  Botswana's Chief Justice, Maruping Dibotelo, subsequently issued a statement on 26 October confirming the BDP's victory, saying that "the Botswana Democratic Party (BDP) garnered at least 29 of the 57 parliamentary seats" in the election.  The electoral commission subsequently said that the BDP had won a total of 37 seats, with the UDC winning 17 and the BCP three. A further four seats will be filled by candidates selected by Parliament, with the president and attorney general filling the last two in the 63-seat chamber. The MPs will select the country's next president, widely expected to be Khama for a second term of five years.

An estimated 700,000 people voted in the election, representing a high turnout in a country with a population of two million and 824,000 registered voters.  Preliminary results showed that the two opposition parties had been most successful in urban areas of the country, and attracted younger voters who disapproved of President Khama's handling of the economy, while the BDP retained its rural support.

See also
List of members of the National Assembly of Botswana 2014–2019

References

Botswana
General
Elections in Botswana
Botswana